Żabbar St. Patrick Football Club is a Maltese football club from the town of Żabbar, which currently plays in the Maltese National Amateur League B. The club was founded in 1912. They also play in the annual Maltese FA Trophy.

History 

Although a football ground close to the Zabbar Gate already existed in 1903, the first teams in Żabbar were only formed a few years later in the first decade of the century. The Zabbar Gate Football Ground was considered as the home-ground of St. George's of Cospicua where they hosted some of the top army and navy teams that were visiting Malta at the time.

It was not until season 1935–36 when a team from Zabbar – Zabbar United – took part in a Malta Football Association competition. Zabbar United placed fifth in the Fourth Division Section A. The following season, Zabbar United placed fourth in Division IV Section B while another team, Zabbar Youngsters, placed fifth in Division IV Section A.

The first honour for a Zabbar side arrived in season 1937–38 when Zabbar Amateurs won Division IV Section A. However they lost the championship decider to Section B winners Pietà Hotspurs 1–2. Zabbar United were taking part in Section B, placing third. Both teams took part in the MFA Challenge Cup but were eliminated in the first round.

The next year, both Zabbar Amateurs and Zabbar United played in Division III. Zabbar Amateurs won Section B after beating Rabat FC 1–0 in a replay after a first decider ended in a 1–1 draw. Zabbar United placed third in Section A. In Season 1939–40, Zabbar Amateurs played in Division 2, placing third. During World War II, no leagues were organized but a team from Zabbar – Zabbar Stars took part in the 8th Army Cup in 1943.

MFA competitions were back in 1944 and Zabbar FC won the Division 2 Christmas Cup after beating Msida United 1–0 in the final. Zabbar played in Division 2 between 1944 and 1945 and 1947–48. They first took part in the FA Trophy in 1946 when they were eliminated by champions Ħamrun Spartans F.C.

The team participated as St. Patrick for the first time in the Second Division league Section A in 1948–49. The following season, they won Section A and hence the first promotion to the top division – Division 1. In Division 1 1950–51, they registered three wins in 14 matches to secure their status.

They were relegated in 1951–52 and played for eight years in Division 2, before winning the Second Division League in 1959–60. They stayed two years in the top division as they were relegated in 1961–62. St. Patrick finished sixth on level points with Lija Athletic in the Second Division League 1963–64. A relegation decider was necessary and Lija emerged as winners by five goals to nil. The Saints therefore had to play in Division 3.

They won the Division 3 Knock-Out in 1965 after beating Msida St-Joseph 1–0 in the final but had to wait until 1969–70 to win promotion after winning Division 3 Section C. Two years later, they won promotion to Division 1 as runners-up in Division 2. However they spent just one year in the top division before being relegated.

St. Patrick were relegated to Division 3 in 1975–76 but the following season they won Division 3 Section A, losing the championship decider to Rabat Ajax.

After being relegated once again, Zabbar won the Division 3 Knock-Out in 1979–80. They went on to win the Division 3 Championship, the Division 3 Knock-Out and the Sons of Malta Cup in 1980–81. The Zabbar side won the Division 2 Championship in 1981–82 and the Division 1 Championship in 1982–83. Zabbar therefore won promotion to the Premier League, however they were relegated the following season.

After being relegated to Division 2, there were successive promotions and relegations from Division 1 and 2. In Division 2, they were runners-up in 1986–87, champions in 1988–89 and section A runners-up, each time winning promotion. They also won the Division II/III Knock-Out in 1990–91.

St. Patrick were promoted to the Maltese Premier League as champions in 1995–96, runners-up in 1998–99 and once again champions in 2003–04. .

In 2012, the club celebrated 100 years of football in Zabbar.

In 2013, the club renamed itself from St. Patrick to Zabbar St Patrick after a general meeting held on Sunday 10 June..

Zabbar St Patrick were promoted to the Maltese First Division at the end of the 2016–17 season, however they were relegated the season after.

In the season 2018–19, Zabbar St. Patrick finished the season in the 11th place and won the decider match against Msida Saint-Joseph F.C. to retain their place in the Maltese Second Division.

The team won the National Amateur Cup in 2022 defeating Marsaskala F.C. 6-2 in the final.

Seniors Squad

Technical Staff

Honours 
Maltese First Division
Winners: 1982–83, 1994-95, 2003-04

Maltese Second Division
Winners: 1949-50, 1959-60, 1981-82, 1988-89

Maltese Third Division
Winners: 1980-81

National Amateur Cup
Winners (1): 2021-22

References 

Association football clubs established in 1912
Football clubs in Malta
1912 establishments in Malta